Wu Jong-shinn (吳宗信, also Wu Tsung-hsin)  is a Taiwanese scientist, professor, and administrator. He is the director general of the National Space Organization (NSO or NSPO).

Education and career 
In 1986 he received a BS in mechanical engineering from National Taiwan University and a MS in the same field from the same school in 1988. In 1994 he received a PhD in aerospace engineering from the University of Michigan. Upon returning to Taiwan he went to work for the NSO and stayed there for two years. In 1998 he joined the faculty of National Chiao Tung University and has spent his career there becoming a distinguished professor.

His specialization is in system engineering, hybrid rocket propulsion and plasma physics.

He is known as “rocket uncle.”

In August 2021 he was appointed to replaced acting NSO director general Yu Hsien-cheng.

Awards and fellowships  
He is an American Society of Mechanical Engineers fellow, an American Institute of Aeronautics and Astronautics (AIAA) associate fellow, and Institute of Electrical and Electronics Engineers member. He sits on the AIAA Hybrid Rocket Technical Committee.

References 

Living people
University of Michigan College of Engineering alumni
National Taiwan University alumni
Year of birth missing (living people)
21st-century Taiwanese physicists
Academic staff of the National Chiao Tung University
Rocket scientists
Space program of Taiwan